Stinking Creek is a  long 2nd order tributary to the Haw River in Chatham County, North Carolina.

Course
Stinking Creek rises about 4 miles southeast of Pittsboro, North Carolina in Chatham County and then flows in a semi-circle to the Haw River at B. Everett Jordan Lake.  Stinking Creek makes up one of the arms of the lake.

Watershed
Stinking Creek drains  of area, receives about 47.5 in/year of precipitation, and has a wetness index of 383.56 and is about 79% forested.

See also
List of rivers of North Carolina

References

Additional images

Rivers of North Carolina
Rivers of Chatham County, North Carolina